Aurangabad Bangar is a census town in Mathura district  in the state of Uttar Pradesh, India.

Geography

Demographics
 India census, Aurangabad Bangar had a population of 8,819. Males constitute 53% of the population and females 47%. Aurangabad Bangar has an average literacy rate of 62%, higher than the national average of 59.5%; with 60% of the males and 40% of females literate. 19% of the population is under 6 years of age.

References

Cities and towns in Mathura district